The Ingenika River is a river located in the Canadian boreal forest, in the province of British Columbia.

The surroundings of the Ingenika River are mainly coniferous forest. The area around the river is almost uninhabited, with fewer than two inhabitants per square kilometre.  The area is part of the boreal climate zone. The mean annual temperature is  °C. The warmest month is July, when the average temperature is  °C, and the coldest is December, with  °C.

References 

Rivers of British Columbia
Cassiar Land District